Zakurskoye is a rural locality (a village) in Chuchkovskoye Rural Settlement, Sokolsky District, Vologda Oblast, Russia. The population was 80 as of 2002.

Geography 
Zakurskoye is located 83 km northeast of Sokol (the district's administrative centre) by road. Klokovo is the nearest rural locality.

References 

Rural localities in Sokolsky District, Vologda Oblast